Fault commonly refers to:
Fault (geology), planar rock fractures showing evidence of relative movement
Fault (law), blameworthiness or responsibility

Fault(s) may also refer to:

Arts, entertainment, and media 
 "Fault", a song by Taproot from Welcome
Faults (film), 2014

Science and technology
Fault (computing), also called a trap or an exception, a type of interrupt in software or operating systems
Fault (technology), an abnormal condition or defect that may lead to a failure
Electrical fault, an abnormal current

Sport and competition
Fault (breeding), an undesirable aspect of structure or appearance of an animal
Fault, in pickleball, any infringement of the rules by a player
Fault, in show jumping, a penalty
Fault, in tennis jargon, a serve that fails to place a tennis ball in the correct area of play

See also
Blame
Defect (disambiguation)
Error
Mistake (disambiguation)
Software bug